The Eidagale (Ciidagale) ([which translates to "army joiner"], Full Name: Da'ud ibn Al-Qādhī Ismā'īl ibn ash-Shaykh Isḥāq ibn Aḥmad), is a major Somali clan and is a sub-division of the Garhajis clan of the Isaaq clan family. Members of this clan are concentrated in the western portions of Somaliland and the Somali region of Ethiopia. The Eidagale are part of the four principal clans of the Isaaq clan family. They are the traditional holders of the Isaaq Sultanate since the 18th century. As descendants of Ismail bin Sheikh Isaaq, its members form a part of the Habar Magaadle confederation, and they constitute the largest sub-clan of the Isaaq. They are traditionally nomadic pastoralists,  merchants and skilled poets.

Distribution

The Eidagale, largely inhabit the eastern Maroodi Jeex region of Somaliland, as well as the Daroor and Aware zones in the Somali region of Ethiopia. They also have a large settlement in Kenya where they are known as a constituent segment of the Isahakia community.

History

Lineage

Sheikh Ishaaq ibn Ahmed was one of the Arabian scholars that crossed the sea from Arabia to the Horn of Africa to spread Islam around 12th to 13th century. He is said to have been descended from Prophet Mohammed's daughter Fatimah. Hence the Sheikh belonged to the Ashraf or Sada, titles given to the descendants of the prophet. It is said he married two local women in Somaliland that left him eight sons, one of them being Ismail (Garhajis).

Medieval period
Historically the Eidagale took part in the conquest of Abyssinia and were part of the Adal Sultanate and are mentioned in the book Futuh Al-Habash (Conquest of Abyssinia) as the Habar Magaadle along with the Habr Yunis, Habar Awal, Arap and Ayub clans. The Habar Magaadle are known for producing a historical figure known as Ahmad Gurey bin Husain who was the right-hand man of Ahmad ibn Ibrahim al-Ghazi.

I. M. Lewis discusses the existence of another leader named Ahmad Gurey, and suggests that the two leaders have been conflated into one historical figure:The text refers to two Ahmad's with the nickname 'Left-handed'. One is regularly presented as 'Ahmad Guray, the Somali' (...) identified as Ahmad Gurey Xuseyn, chief of the Habar Magaadle. Another reference, however, appears to link the Habar Magadle with the Eidagal. The other Ahmad is simply referred to as 'Imam Ahmad' or simply the 'Imam'.This Ahmad is not qualified by the adjective Somali (...) The two Ahmad's have been conflated into one figure, the heroic Ahmed Guray
For centuries, the tomb of saint Aw Barkhadle, which is located between Berbera and Hargeisa, was used by the Isaaq clans to settle disputes and to swear oaths of alliances under a holy relic attributed to Bilal Ibn Rabah. As traditional leaders of the Isaaq clans, the Eidagale placed themselves as mediators during the disputes. 
When any grave question arises affecting the interests of the Isaakh tribe in general. On a paper yet carefully preserved in the tomb, and bearing the sign-manual of Belat [Bilal], the slave of one of the early khaleefehs, fresh oaths of lasting friendship and lasting alliances are made...In the season of 1846 this relic was brought to Berbera in charge of the Haber Gerhajis, and on it the rival tribes of Aial Ahmed and Aial Yunus swore to bury all animosity and live as brethren. 

The Eidagale were renowned for their equestrian skills, and their devastating raids extended between the coast and the interior. According to Swayne, who traversed through Somaliland in the late 19th century, the Eidagale were amongst the clans most addicted to raiding:
The tribes near the northern coast most addicted to raiding appear to be the Jibril Abokor sub-tribe of the Habr Awal, the Mahamud Gerad Dolbahanta, and the Eidagalla, Habr Gerhajis.
Apart from their equestrian skills, the Eidagale are also famed for their eloquence in traditional Somali poetry (gabay), producing many famous poets such as Abdi Gahayr, Xasan Tarabi, and Elmi Boodhari. Historically,  the Eidagale were viewed as "the recognized experts in the composition of poetry" by their fellow Somali contemporaries:
Among the tribes, the Eidagalla are the recognized experts in the composition of poetry. One individual poet of the Eidagalla may be no better than a good poet of another tribe, but the Eidagalla appear to have more poets than any other tribe. "if you had a hundred Eidagalla men here," Hersi Jama once told me, "And asked which of them could sing his own gabei ninety-five would be able to sing. The others would still be learning."

For centuries, the Eidagale were influential stakeholders in the long-distance Somali caravan trade. Eidagale merchants procured various goods from the Somali Region in present-day Ethiopia, such as livestock, acacia gum, myrrh and ghee, which were subsequently exported to Southern Arabia. The Eidagale caravan merchants founded several inland trade entrepôts in the interior, which also includes the modern city of Hargeisa, founded in the 19th century as a caravan junction between Berbera and the Somali interior.

Somalis of the Habr Gerhajis tribe arrive from Ogadain with feathers, myrrh, gum, sheep, cattle, and ghee, carrying away in exchange piece goods; they also make four trips in the season; they remain for less than a month, and during their stay reside with fellow-tribesmen, taking their meals in the mokhbâzah or eating-house.

Isaaq Sultanate 

The Eidagale are the traditional holders of the Isaaq Sultanate since the 18th century. The Isaaq Sultanate was established in the mid-18th century by Sultan Guled Abdi Eisa of the Eidagale clan. His coronation took place after the legendary warrior Abdi Eisa led the Isaaq to victory in the battle of Lafaruug and defeated the Absame tribes, permanently pushing them out of present-day Maroodi Jeex region. After witnessing his leadership skills, noble conduct and valiance, the Isaaq chiefs recognized him as their Grand Sultan but Abdi instead put forward his son Guled. Guled's Sultanate predates the Habr Yunis Sultanate, which broke off from Eidagale tutelage several decades after the start of his rule. Sultan Guled ruled the Isaaq from the 1750s up until his death in the early 19th century, where he was succeeded by his eldest son Farah. Sultan Farah further expanded the influence of the Sultanate by establishing ties with various Muslim polities across the Gulf, particularly the Al-Qasimi family whom he corresponded with in regard to military action against the British Navy who blockaded Berbera and temporarily cut off vital trade.

Sultans of the Eidagale (and the Isaaq)

Clan Tree

A summarized clan family tree of the Eidagale is presented below.
Sheikh Ishaaq Bin Ahmed (Sheikh Ishaaq)
Habar Habuusheed
  Ahmed (Tol-Ja'lo) 
  Muuse (Habr Je'lo)
  Ibrahiim (Sanbuur)
  Muhammad ('Ibraan)
 Habar Magaadle
 Abdirahman (Subeer Awal )
  Ayub
  Muhammad (Arap)
 Ismail (Garhajis)
Daud (Eidagale)
Bilal
Mohamed (Guyobe)
Ali Afweina
Urkurag
Abokor
Esa (Baho Deeqsi)
Musa
Abokor Musa
Abdirahman Musa
Yunis Abdirahman (Rer Yunis)(Dan-Wadaago)
Abdulle Abdirahman
Mohamed Abdulle (Ba Delo)(Dan-Wadaago)
Ibrahim Abdulle
Kul Ibrahim
Abdi Ibrahim (Abdi Dheere) (Baho Deeqsi)
Abokor Ibrahim
Iidle Abokor (Rer Iidle) (Baho Deeqsi)
Hussein Abokor
Mataan Hussein
Hamud Matan (Gaashaanbuur)
Roble Matan (Gaashaanbuur)
Adan Matan
Burale Adan (Gaashaanbuur)
Abane Adan (Gaashaanbuur)
Muse  Adan (Gaashaanbuur)
Barre Adan (Gaashaanbuur)
Ergin Adan (Gaashaanbuur)
Wais Adan (Gaashaanbuur)
Abdille Adan (Gaashaanbuur)
Damal Adan
Gobdon Damal
Deria Damal (Dhamal Yar Yar)
Fatah Damal (Dhamal Yar Yar)
Gabib Damal (Dhamal Yar Yar)
Hode Damal (Dhamal Yar Yar)
Esa Damal
Liban Esa
Hassan Esa 
Warfa Esa
Guled Esa
Abdi Esa
Ainashe Abdi
Adan Abdi
Afweina Abdi
Guled Abdi Sultan Guled
Yusuf Guled
Roble Guled
Jama Guled
Deria Guled
Egal Guled
Gatah Guled
Farah Guled (Sultan Farah)
Dualeh Guled
Abdi Guled
Ali Guled
Rageh Guled
Wais Guled
Habrwa Guled
Awid Guled
Mohamed Guled
Sugulle Guled
Amareh Guled

Notable people
 Guled – 1st Grand Sultan of the Isaaq clan 
 Abdillahi Deria – 5th Grand Sultan of the Isaaq clan and prominent anti-colonial figurehead 
 Rashid Abdillahi – 6th Grand Sultan of the Isaaq clan
 Elmi Boodhari – Poet known as the “King of Romance” and is very famous in the Somali world for his love poems.
 Faysal Ali Warabe – chairman of UCID party (Justice and Development party of Somaliland) 
 Ismail Mahmud Hurre - former  Foreign Minister of the Transitional Federal Government of Somalia, between 2000-2002 and 2006-2007
 Hussein Hasan – famous poet & warrior
 Deria Hassan – 4th Grand Sultan of the Isaaq clan
 Mahamed Abdiqadir – 8th Grand Sultan of the Isaaq clan
 Mahdi Mohammed Gulaid - former Deputy Prime Minister of Somalia from 2017 to 2022 and acting Prime Minister briefly in 2022
 Hussein Mohammed Adam (Tanzania) - foremost Somali intellectual and scholar who founded the Somali Studies International Association (SSIA)
 Jama Mohamed Ghalib – former Police Commissioner of the Somali Democratic Republic, Secretary of Interior, Minister of Labor and Social Affairs, Minister of Local Government and Rural Development, Minister of Transportation, and Minister of Interior
 Mohamed Mooge Liibaan – prominent Somali instrumentalist and vocalist, regarded as one of the greatest to have ever lived
 Ahmed Mooge Liibaan – prominent Somali instrumentalist and vocalist
 Khadra Dahir Cige – popular Somali singer
 Hussein Mohamed Jiciir – former Mayor of Hargeisa from 2003 to 2012 and one of the longest serving mayors in the history of Somaliland
 Hussein Arab Isse - former Deputy Prime Minister and Minister of Defence of Somalia, between 2011 and 2012
 Jama Abdullahi Qalib -  served as speaker of the Somali Parliament during the Somali Republic's early civilian administration, between 1960 and 1964
 Daud Mahamed – 9th and current Grand Sultan of the Isaaq clan
 Abdikarim Ahmed Mooge - current mayor of Hargeisa

References

Somali clans in Ethiopia
Isaaq Sultanate